Berakhot, Brachot, or Brochos may refer to:

 Berakhah, a Jewish benediction
Any one of the various benedictions; see List of Jewish prayers and blessings
 Tractate Berakhot of the Talmud, which discusses benedictions, among other topics

See also
 V'Zot HaBerachah, the last of the weekly Torah portions

Hebrew words and phrases in Jewish prayers and blessings